Helcogrammoides antarcticus is a species of triplefin blenny in the genus Helcogrammoides. It was described by Aedo Pascual Tomo in 1982. This species has only been recorded from Paradise Bay on the Antarctic Peninsula.

References

antarcticus
Fish described in 1982